Kari Kjønaas Kjos (born 25 January 1962, in Oslo) is a Norwegian politician representing the Progress Party. She is a representative of Akershus in the Storting since 2005 where she since 2013 has chairs the Standing Committee on Health and Care Services.

She has worked as assistant in kindergartens and had administrative positions in business. She studied economics at BI Norwegian Business School 1993–95. She worked for the Progress Party at district level between 2000 and 2005.

Storting committees
2005–2009 member of the Standing Committee on Labour and Social Affairs.
2009–2013 member of the Standing Committee on Health and Care Services.
2013–current chair of the Standing Committee on Health and Care Services.

References

External links

 Fremskrittspartiet - Biography

1962 births
Living people
Progress Party (Norway) politicians
Members of the Storting
Women members of the Storting
21st-century Norwegian politicians
21st-century Norwegian women politicians